This is a list of supermarket chains in Asia.

Afghanistan
 Chelsea Supermarket
 Spinneys

Armenia
 Carrefour
 SPAR

Azerbaijan
 Araz Supermarket

Bangladesh
 Lulu Hypermarket
 Lulu Supermarket
 Spinneys

Bahrain

Cambodia
 Big C
 Makro

China

Cyprus
 Carrefour
 Lidl
 METRO (supermarket)
  Olympic

Egypt

Georgia
 Carrefour
 SPAR - 100 stores
 Ori Nabiji - mainly in Tbilisi

Hong Kong
 ÆON (JUSCO) 
 c!ty'super
 China Resources Vanguard Shop
 DCH Food Mart
 Marks & Spencer
 PARKnSHOP
 Seibu Department Stores
 Seiyu Group
 Sogo (also considered a department store)
 Uny APiTA
 Wellcome
 Market Place by Jasons

India
 Kurinji Metro Bazaar
 7-Eleven
 Big Bazaar
 D-Mart
 Easyday
 Foodworld
 HyperCity
 Lulu Hypermarket
 Maveli Stores
 Metro Cash & Carry
 More
 Namdhari's Fresh
 Nilgiri's
 Reliance Fresh
 Spar
 Spencer's Retail
 Triveni Supermarkets
 Walmart

Indonesia

Iran
 Carrefour
 Proma Hypermarket
 Refah Chain Stores Co. 
 Shahrvand Chain Stores Inc.
 Svetofor

Israel
 Carrefour
 Hatzi Hinam
 Rami Levy
 Shufersal
 Tiv Ta'am

Japan
 ÆON
 Albis
 Don Quixote - discount store
 Ito-Yokado
 Izumiya
 Kanesue
 Kansai Super
 Life Supermarket (ja)
 Maxvalu Tokai
 Seiyu
 Seiyu Group
 Uny Apita, Biago
 Yaokō, Kanto region, mainly Saitama Prefecture and Chiba Prefecture.

Kazakhstan

Kuwait
 Carrefour
 Lulu Hypermarket
 Lulu Supermarket
 The Sultan Center
 Monoprix
 Saveco
 City Centre

Laos
 Big C

Lebanon
 Carrefour
 Monoprix
 Spinneys
 The Sultan Center
 noknok

Malaysia

Mongolia

Northern Cyprus

Pakistan
 CSD Pakistan
 Carrefour Pakistan
 Imtiaz Super Market
 Metro Cash and Carry Pakistan
 Spar Pakistan
 Utility Stores Corporation

Philippines

Qatar
 Carrefour
 Carrefour Market
 Lulu Supermarket
 Lulu Hypermarket
 Mega Mart Supermarket
 Spinneys

Russia

Saudi Arabia
 Panda
 Carrefour
 HyperPanda
 Abdullah Al-Othaim Markets
 Tamimi
 Danube
 Al-Sadhan Supermarket
 Lulu Hypermarket
 Lulu Supermarket
 Nesto Hypermarket
 BinDawood

Singapore
 Cold Storage (DFI Group)
 Giant (DFI Group)
 Jasons Market Place (DFI Group)
 NTUC Fairprice
 Prime Supermarket
 Sheng Siong

South Korea

National chains 
 Costco
 E-mart
 Lotte Mart
 Homeplus
 GS THE FRESH, Owner by GS Group
 NongHyup Hanaro Mart, Owner by NongHyup and Regional NongHyup

Regional chains
 MEGA MART, Owner by Nongshim
 TopMart, TopMart is South Korea Regional SuperMarket Chains. Owner by SEOWON DISTRIBUTION Co.,Ltd.
 TRIAL, TRIAL is Japan Supermarket Chain Group. South Korea Store Owner by TRIAL Korea Co.,Ltd.
 IGA, South Korea Store Owner by IGA Korea
 Segyero Mart

Sri Lanka
 Arpico Super Centre
 Cargills PLC (Food City)
 Keells Super (Jaykay Marketing Services)
 Laugfs Supermarkets
 Spar
 Glomark (softlogic Holdings)
Star United

Taiwan
 A.mart
 c!ty'super
 Carrefour
 Costco
 Jasons Market Place
 PXmart
 RT-Mart
 Wellcome

Thailand

Turkey
BIM 
Carrefour
Dia  
Metro 
Migros Türk - 1447 stores
Real 
Kipa
A101 - 9000 stores

United Arab Emirates
 Auchan
 Carrefour
 Géant
 HyperPanda
 Lulu Hypermarket
 Nesto
 Spinneys
 Arwani Store
 Talal Market

Uzbekistan
 Auchan
 Kipa
 Makro Supermarket
 SPAR

Vietnam
 ÆON
 Big C
 Lotte Mart
 VinMart

References 

Asia
 
Supermarket chains